Shangó is the thirteenth studio album by Santana. The album reached #22 on the Billboard 200 album charts. The single "Hold On" from the album reached number 15 in the U.S. Billboard Hot 100 singles chart and number 17 on Billboard's Top Tracks chart.  A second single from the album, "Nowhere to Run", peaked at number 66 on the Hot 100 chart and number thirteen on the Mainstream Rock chart and a third single reached number 34 in the Mainstream Rock chart.

Track listing

Side One 

 "The Nile" (Alex  Ligertwood, Carlos Santana, Gregg Rolie)-4:55
 "Hold On" (Ian Thomas)-4:21
 "Night Hunting Time" (Paul Brady)-4:42
 "Nowhere to Run" (Russ Ballard)-4:04
 "Nueva York" (Armando Peraza, Ligertwood, Santana, David Margen, Graham Lear, Rolie, Orestes Vilato, Richard Baker, Raul Rekow)-4:59

Side two
 "Oxun (Oshūn)" (Santana, Ligertwood, Rolie, Lear, Peraza, Rekow, Vilató) - 4:14
 "Body Surfing" (Santana, Ligertwood) - 4:24
 "What Does It Take (To Win Your Love)" (Johnny Bristol, Vernon Bullock, Harvey Fuqua) - 3:24
 "Let Me Inside" (Santana, Chris Solberg) - 3:32
 "Warrior" (Margen, Baker, Ligertwood, Santana) - 4:21
 "Shangó" (Rekow, Vilató, Peraza) - 1:44

Personnel
Santana
 Alex Ligertwood – vocals, rhythm guitar
 Devadip Carlos Santana – guitar, vocals, producer
 Richard Baker – keyboards
 Gregg Rolie – organ (5), vocals, producer
 David Margen – bass
 Graham Lear – drums
 Armando Peraza – congas, bongos, vocals
 Raul Rekow – congas, vocals
 Orestes Vilató – timbales, vocals
Technical
 Bill Szymczyk – arranger, engineer, mixing, producer
 John Ryan – arranger, producer
 Jim Gaines – engineer
 Will Herold – engineer
 Ben King – second mixing engineer
 Maureen Droney – assistant engineer
 Ray Etzler – director
 Ted Jensen – mastering
 Richard Stutting – art direction, design
 Guido Harari – photography
 Cristobal Gonzáles - Yarn painting

Charts

Certifications

References

External links

 Shango review at UltimateSantana.com
 Shango review & credits at AllMusic.com

Santana (band) albums
1982 albums
Albums produced by Bill Szymczyk
Albums produced by Carlos Santana
Columbia Records albums